Wolfsburg-Unkeroda is a former municipality in the Wartburgkreis district of Thuringia, Germany. Since July 2018, it is part of the municipality Gerstungen.

References

Former municipalities in Thuringia
Wartburgkreis
Grand Duchy of Saxe-Weimar-Eisenach